Joseph Thuney (born November 18, 1992) is an American football guard for the Kansas City Chiefs of the National Football League (NFL). He played college football at NC State. He was drafted by the New England Patriots in the third round (78th overall selection) in the 2016 NFL Draft.

Early life
His parents Mike and Beth Thuney raised him and their other three children, Monica, Eric and Megan in Centerville, Ohio. There Thuney was a member of two D4 state championship teams at Archbishop Alter High School. As a Senior he was Greater Catholic League Lineman of the Year and president of his senior class.

College career
Thuney played sparingly at NC State during his freshman year. He came into his redshirt sophomore year as the projected starting center but ended up starting the season opener at right tackle, the second game at right guard and the last 10 games at left tackle. In his junior year he started at left guard and at left tackle his senior year. He became the first offensive lineman for NC State to be named an All-American since Jim Ritcher in 1979. He was a finalist for the Campbell Trophy, which rewards the best combination of academics, community service, and performance on the field, and he graduated from NC State cum laude in just three years. NFL reporter Matt Verderame claims that when Thuney took the Wonderlic Personnel Test he avoided answering many of the questions so he would not come off as too smart.

Professional career

New England Patriots
Thuney was drafted by the Patriots in the third round of the 2016 NFL Draft with the 78th overall selection, 13 picks before the Patriots drafted his teammate, quarterback Jacoby Brissett. Thuney won the starting left guard spot to start the season and remained the starter for all 16 regular-season games; according to Pro-Football-Reference.com, he played the highest number of snaps of any Patriot in 2016. He also started all three postseason games. On February 5, 2017, Thuney was part of the Patriots team that won Super Bowl LI. In the game, the Patriots defeated the Atlanta Falcons by a score of 34–28 in overtime. The PFWA named Thuney to its 2016 All-Rookie Team at guard. Thuney made it to his second straight Super Bowl when the Patriots defeated the Jacksonville Jaguars in the AFC Championship Game. The Patriots failed to repeat as Super Bowl Champions when they lost 41-33 to the Philadelphia Eagles.

Thuney once again started all 16 games at left guard for the Patriots in 2018, and for the third time in his three-year career, the Patriots made it to the Super Bowl.  According to Mike Reiss of ESPN, that makes Thuney the first player in NFL history to start in the Super Bowl in each of his first three seasons. The Patriots defeated the Los Angeles Rams, 13–3, to win their second Super Bowl in three years. Thuney played every offensive snap for the team and helped contain Defensive Player of the Year Aaron Donald.

The Patriots placed the franchise tag on Thuney on March 16, 2020. He signed the franchise tag on March 20, 2020.

In 2020, with David Andrews out on injured reserve, Thuney was pressed into service at center for the Patriots' Week 3 game against the Las Vegas Raiders.

Kansas City Chiefs
Thuney signed a five-year, $80 million contract with the Kansas City Chiefs on March 18, 2021. Thuney continued to play left guard for the Chiefs during the 2022 NFL season. The Chiefs would go on to Super Bowl LVII where Thuney helped to hold the Philadelphia Eagles defense in check, as the offensive line gave up zero sacks and the Chiefs defeated the Eagles 38-35. This was his third Super Bowl ring and first with the Chiefs.

NFL career statistics

References

External links 

 North Carolina State Wolfpack bio
 New England patriots bio 

1992 births
Living people
American football offensive linemen
NC State Wolfpack football players
New England Patriots players
Kansas City Chiefs players
People from Centerville, Ohio
Players of American football from Ohio
Ed Block Courage Award recipients
American Conference Pro Bowl players